Caleb Gardner (173924December 1806) was an American slave trader, ship owner, and sea captain who was born in Newport, Rhode Island. When he was a boy, he lived near the harbor and owned a boat. This enabled him to become familiar with the waters and islands of Narragansett Bay. As a young man, he became a sea-captain, sailing his own ship to China and the East Indies. He became a prolific slave trader, bringing thousands of humans in bondage to the shores of Rhode Island.

Revolutionary War
Before the beginning of the Revolution he had retired from the sea and engaged in slave trading in his native town. At the time of the war, he was a strong Whig. 

In late 1775, Gardner raised a company of militiamen. He was assigned with this company to Colonel William Richmond's Regiment. He became major and was promoted to lieutenant colonel on Aug. 19, 1776.  He became member of the council of war and of the Rhode Island state government. 

He resided in Newport in 1778, when the French squadron under Count d'Estaing was blockaded there by the greatly superior British fleet under Admiral Howe. A sudden and dense fog prevented an immediate attack by the English, but they occupied both entrances to the harbor and waited for daylight. Looking through a spyglass from his housetop, Captain Gardner noted the disposition of the hostile fleets. As soon as it was dark, he rowed himself to the ship of the French admiral and offered to pilot him to a safe position. With his own hand, he steered the admiral's ship through a channel that he had known from boyhood. Thee other vessels, with all lights extinguished, followed singly in his wake. After piloting the French beyond the enemy and to clear water, he returned to the island. He reached his own house before daylight. He was among the groups along the waterfront who marveled, when the fog lifted, at the disappearance of the French fleet.

Count d'Estaing's report of the affair to Louis XVI was confidential, since its disclosure would have exposed his guide to the dangerous displeasure of the English government, and of the Tory element in Rhode Island, but the king, through his ambassador in the United States, the Chevalier de la Luzerne, sent to the amateur pilot a sum of money, with which the latter bought an estate near Newport, and built upon it a house, known later as "Bateman's."

Throughout the war, Colonel Gardner was a trusted adviser of the French officers in Rhode Island and of General George Washington, who was his friend and correspondent. After peace was declared, he was made French consul at Newport, where he resided until his death. He became president of a bank, warden of Trinity Church, and head of the volunteer fire department of the town.

Death
Gardner died in Newport on 24December 1806.

Sources
 

1739 births
1806 deaths
American sailors
American slave traders
American slave owners
American expatriates in China